These are the official results of the women's 4 × 100 m relay event at the 1980 Summer Olympics in Moscow, Soviet Union. Only 8 teams competed, thus there were no heats. The final was held on August 1, 1980.

Medalists

Records
These were the standing World and Olympic records (in seconds) prior to the 1980 Summer Olympics.

Final
Held on Friday August 1, 1980

See also
 1982 Women's European Championships 4 × 100 m Relay (Athens)

References

External links
Final Results
Official Report
Official Report Volume III, Page 81

R
Relay foot races at the Olympics
1980 in women's athletics
Women's events at the 1980 Summer Olympics